V C Abhilash is an Indian film director and actor who works in Malayalam cinema. He began his career as a director and screenwriter in 2018 with the film Aalorukkam. The film was awarded in the 65th National Film Awards, and received the National Film Award for Best Film on Other Social Issues .

Early life

Abhilash was born in the Nedumangad, Thiruvananthapuram district of Kerala. Abhilash studied at Emmanuel High School. After pre-degree from St. Mary Higher Secondary School, he completed his B.Sc. degree from University of Kerala. He married Rakhi Krishna in December 2014 .

Career
Abhilash started his film career as a director and scriptwriter to the film Aalorukkam (2018). His second film was Oru Supradhana Karyam (An Important Matter, 2018). He also acted in Aalorukkam as Pappu Pisharody's nephew.

Filmography 
Movies:
 Aalorukkam (writer, director, actor)
Sabash Chandrabose (writer, director)
Oru Supradhana Karyam (writer, director)

Recognition
National Film Awards for Best Film on Other Social Issues.
Kashmir world film festival for best Indian movie . 
Movie street special jury award. 
Kerala Film Critics Association Awards, for Second Best film.
Kerala Film Critics Association Awards for director of Best Second film.
Adoor bhasi award for Best film. 
Perunathachan award for Best film. 
Perunathachan award for Best director. 
Perunathachan award for Best script writer

Film festivals
Official Selection - Covellite International Film Festival, USA.
Official Selection - The Fatherhood Image Film Festival. USA.
Official Selection - Kashmir world film festival, India 
Official Selection - 04th All Lights India International Film Festival 2018 (ALIIFF)
Official Selection - 9th Jagran Film Festival, MUMBAI
Official Selection - National film festival of Kerala
Official Selection - Malayalam film festival of Pune
Official Selection - Habitat national film festival, NEW DELHI

References

External links
 

Year of birth missing (living people)
Living people
21st-century Indian film directors
Film directors from Kerala
Film directors from Thiruvananthapuram
Malayalam film directors
Indian male screenwriters
Malayalam screenwriters
Screenwriters from Kerala
Indian male film actors
Male actors from Thiruvananthapuram
Male actors in Malayalam cinema
Directors who won the Best Film on Other Social Issues National Film Award